Mangorei is a locality on the outskirts of New Plymouth in Taranaki, New Zealand. The city centre is about 5 km to the north-west. State Highway 3 passes to the south-west.

Lake Mangomahoe is a lake on the eastern side of State Highway 3.

Demographics

Mangorei had a population of 1,998 at the 2018 New Zealand census, an increase of 315 people (18.7%) since the 2013 census, and an increase of 729 people (57.4%) since the 2006 census. There were 702 households, comprising 1,041 males and 957 females, giving a sex ratio of 1.09 males per female. The median age was 41.7 years (compared with 37.4 years nationally), with 450 people (22.5%) aged under 15 years, 270 (13.5%) aged 15 to 29, 1,074 (53.8%) aged 30 to 64, and 204 (10.2%) aged 65 or older.

Ethnicities were 95.9% European/Pākehā, 7.7% Māori, 0.5% Pacific peoples, 1.5% Asian, and 2.0% other ethnicities. People may identify with more than one ethnicity.

The percentage of people born overseas was 14.7, compared with 27.1% nationally.

Although some people chose not to answer the census's question about religious affiliation, 58.7% had no religion, 32.6% were Christian, 0.3% were Muslim, 0.3% were Buddhist and 1.7% had other religions.

Of those at least 15 years old, 306 (19.8%) people had a bachelor's or higher degree, and 234 (15.1%) people had no formal qualifications. The median income was $38,300, compared with $31,800 nationally. 354 people (22.9%) earned over $70,000 compared to 17.2% nationally. The employment status of those at least 15 was that 840 (54.3%) people were employed full-time, 315 (20.3%) were part-time, and 33 (2.1%) were unemployed.

Education
Mangorei School is a coeducational full primary (years 1–8) school with a roll of  students as of  The school started as Lower Mangorei School in 1926, with a previous Lower Mangorei School and Kent School consolidating onto the present site. Upper Mangorei School was closed in 1938 and Korito School was closed in 1939, with students from those schools increasing Mangorei School's roll.

Notes

Further reading

General historical works

People

School

External links
 Mangorei School website

Suburbs of New Plymouth
Populated places in Taranaki